This is a list of flag bearers who have represented Ukraine at the Olympics. Flag bearers carry the national flag of their country at the opening ceremony of the Olympic Games.

Before the 2020 Summer Olympics, it was said in Ukraine that there was "curse of flag bearers" because flag bearers had never won a medal at the Games at which they had been carrying the national flag. Olena Kostevych was the first one to debunk that myth after winning bronze in mixed 10 metre air pistol team event.

See also
Ukraine at the Olympics

References

Ukraine at the Olympics
Ukraine
Olympic flagbearers